Robyn Anne Nevin  (25 September 1942) is an Australian actress, director, and stage producer, recognised with the Sidney Myer Performing Arts Awards and the JC Williamson Award at the Helpmann Awards for her outstanding contributions to Australian theatre performance art. Former head of both the Queensland Theatre Company and the Sydney Theatre Company, she has directed more than 30 productions and acted in more than 80 plays, collaborating with internationally renowned artists, including Richard Wherrett, Simon Phillips, Geoffrey Rush, Julie Andrews, Aubrey Mellor, Jennifer Flowers, Cate Blanchett and Lee Lewis.

Nevin is also known for her roles in films and televisions series, including Water Under the Bridge (1980) as Shasta, role that earned her a Logie Awards and a Penguin Award, Upper Middle Bogan (2014) and Top of the Lake (2014), and international film acting as Councillor Dillard in The Matrix Reloaded and The Matrix Revolutions (both 2003), and as Edna in the horror film Relic (2020).

Early life 
Robyn Nevin was born in Melbourne, to Josephine Pauline Casey and William George Nevin. She was educated at Genazzano Convent until the age of 11, when she moved with her family to Hobart, Tasmania, and was enrolled at the Fahan School, a non-denominational school for girls. While there, she played the lead in the school's production of Snow White at the Theatre Royal. Her parents were conservative and conventional, her father the managing director of Dunlop Australia, her mother a housewife, so to enter the National Institute of Dramatic Art (NIDA) at the age of 16 in the very first intake in 1959 was a brave step, in which she was fully supported by her parents.

Career 
At the outset of her career, she had a variety of roles in radio and television, working mainly at the Australian Broadcasting Commission, including current affairs, music, chat shows and children's shows throughout the early 1960s. With the Old Tote Theatre Company she acted in The Legend of King O'Malley by Bob Ellis and Michael Boddy in 1970. She gravitated back to theatre, where she has been a constant presence for the last 40 years.

Although theatre has been her home ground she has also starred in numerous Australian films and mini-series, landing many credits for strong supporting roles. She made one foray into directing in The More Things Change... (1986).

In 1996 she became artistic director of the Queensland Theatre Company, a position which she held with great success, rescuing the company from bankruptcy and leaving it flourishing in 1999, when she took over the position of artistic director of the Sydney Theatre Company, where she was artistic director until the end of 2007, having created such memorable additions as The Actor's Company, the only professional repertory company in the nation, and the hugely successful Wharf Revue.

In 2006 she established The STC Actors Company and directed its debut production of Brecht's Mother Courage and Her Children. Her other extensive directing credits for Sydney Theatre Company include: Boy Gets Girl (2005), Summer Rain (2005), Scenes from a Separation (2004), Hedda Gabler (2004), Harbour (2004), The Real Thing (2003), A Doll's House (2002) and Hanging Man (2002).

Other directing credits include After the Ball, Honour, Summer Rain and A Month in the Country (Queensland Theatre Company); Kid Stakes, Scenes from a Separation, Summer of the Seventeenth Doll and On Top of the World (Melbourne Theatre Company); The Removalists (State Theatre of South Australia) and The Marriage of Figaro (State Opera of South Australia).

Nevin has performed in a range of roles at the Sydney Theatre Company, beginning in 1979 as Miss Docker in A Cheery Soul by Patrick White (reprised in 2001); and also including as Roxane in Cyrano de Bergerac in 1981; as Ranyevskaya in The Cherry Orchard by Anton Chekhov in 2005; and as Mrs Venable in Suddenly Last Summer by Tennessee Williams in 2015.

Personal life 
Nevin has been married twice, most notably in her second marriage to "prison playwright" Jim McNeil (1975–1977). She currently lives with her partner, US-born actor and screenwriter Nicholas Hammond. They met when they starred in Alan Ayckbourn's Woman in Mind at the STC in 1987. From her first marriage to Barry Crook, she has a daughter Emily Russell (born 1968) who is also an actor.

Awards and honours 
Nevin has won multiple Helpmann, Green Room and Sydney Theatre Awards for her theatre work. Her Helpmann Awards include Best Female Actor in a Play for Women of Troy, Best Female Actor in a Supporting Role in a Play for Summer of the Seventeenth Doll and Angels in America, and Best Female Actor in a Supporting Role in a Musical for My Fair Lady.

In 1981, she won the TV Logie award in the 'Best Lead Actress in a Miniseries or Telemovie' category for her role as Shasta in Water Under The Bridge on the Ten Network. She had already won Logies as 'Most Popular Female' in Tasmania in 1965 and 1967 during her stint at the ABC.

On 8 June 1981, she was made a Member of the Order of Australia for services to the performing arts. She was promoted to Officer in the 2020 Queen's Birthday Honours for " distinguished service to the performing arts as an acclaimed actor and artistic director, and as a mentor and role model ".

In 1999 she was awarded an honorary doctorate from the University of Tasmania.

On 21 January 2004 she gave the Australia Day Address.

Film and television awards

Theatre awards

Filmography

Film

Television

Theatre and musical

Sydney Theatre Company and other 
Sydney Theatre Company is an Australian theatre company based in Sydney, New South Wales, which performs at The Wharf Theatre, the Roslyn Packer Theatre and the Sydney Opera House. Nevin was associate artistic director from 1984 to 1987, and first artistic director from 1999 to 2007, producing twenty plays. She has also acted in twenty-seven productions of the company.

Melbourne Theatre Company 
Melbourne Theatre Company is an Australian theatre company based in Melbourne, Victoria, which performs at the Southbank Theatre, the Arts Centre Melbourne and the Malthouse. Nevin directed four plays in the 90s and she was the artistic director of the company with Pamela Rabe, Aidan Fennessy in 2012. She has also acted in fourteen productions of the company.

References

External links 
 
 Australia Day Address 2004
 In the Company of Actors, documentary with Nevin, Cate Blanchett, Hugo Weaving, Justine Clarke
Robyn Nevin Curriculum Vitae at Shanahan Management

1942 births
Actresses from Melbourne
Australian film actresses
Australian stage actresses
Australian television actresses
Australian theatre directors
Helpmann Award winners
Living people
Logie Award winners
Officers of the Order of Australia
Members of the Order of Australia
National Institute of Dramatic Art alumni
20th-century Australian actresses
21st-century Australian actresses
People educated at Genazzano FCJ College